Francis Pasquale Matteo (April 2, 1896 – December 19, 1983) was an American football tackle who played four seasons with the Rochester Jeffersons of the National Football League. He played college football at Syracuse University and attended North High School in Syracuse, New York.

References

External links
Just Sports Stats

1896 births
1983 deaths
Players of American football from Syracuse, New York
American football tackles
Syracuse Orange football players
Rochester Jeffersons players